"Uptown Girl" is a 1983 song by Billy Joel.

Uptown Girl(s) may also refer to:

 Uptown Girl (EP), by Mirani, 2021
 "Uptown Girl", a 1981 song by Leif Garrett
 "Uptown Girl", a season 8 episode of Degrassi: The Next Generation
 Uptown Girls, a 2003 American film
 Uptown Girls (group), an American music group active during the 1980s